Keutschach am See is a municipality in the district of Klagenfurt-Land in the Austrian state of Carinthia.

Geography
The municipality lies in a glacial valley between the Wörthersee Lake and Mt. Pyramidenkogel on the north and the summits of the Sattnitz range on the south. Other nearby lakes include Hafnersee, Baßgeigensee, and Rauschelesee. Large parts of the valley since 1970 form a protected landscape area.

Population
According to the 2001 census 5.6% of the population are Carinthian Slovenes.

History

Chodesach in the Duchy of Carinthia was first mentioned in an 1150 deed. The estates were the ancestral seat of the Keutschach noble family, documented since 1299, whose most noted scion was Leonhard von Keutschach (c.1442–1519), Prince-Archbishop of Salzburg from 1495 until his death. In the early 16th century, the dynasty had a Renaissance castle erected, which later was replaced by a nearby Baroque building, called the "New Castle" (Neues Schloss), finished in 1679 and rebuilt under the Orsini-Rosenberg noble family in the 18th century.

For centuries, agriculture was the most practised economic system until summer tourism became more and more important during the 20th century. Nowadays tourism is the biggest source of income in this town.

Politics
Seats in the municipal assembly (Gemeinderat) as of 2015 local elections:

 Social Democratic Party of Austria (SPÖ): 7
Parteifreie Liste Gerhard Oleschko (-PLO-): 5 
 Austrian People's Party (ÖVP): 4
 Green Unity List (GEL): 2
Freedom Party of Austria (FPÖ) and party free: 1

The mayor is the since 2015 directly elected Karl Dovjak (Social Democratic Party of Austria ).

Twin towns — sister cities

Keutschach is twinned with:
 Medea, Friuli-Venezia Giulia, Italy

References

Cities and towns in Klagenfurt-Land District